Richard Payne (9 June 1827 – 11 April 1906) was an English cricketer. Payne was a right-handed batsman who bowled right-arm medium with both roundarm and underarm bowling styles. He was born at East Grinstead, Sussex.

Payne made his first-class debut for Sussex against Nottinghamshire at Trent Bridge in 1853. He made six further first-class appearances for the county, the last of which came against Kent in 1866 at the Higher Common Ground, Tunbridge. In his seven matches for Sussex, he scored 81 runs at an average of 6.75, with a high score of 28. With the ball, he took 3 wickets at a bowling average of 16.66, with best figures of 2/23.

He died at Tonbridge, Kent, on 11 April 1906. His brothers, Charles and Joseph, played first-class cricket, as did his nephews William Payne and Alfred Payne.

References

External links

1827 births
1906 deaths
People from East Grinstead
English cricketers
Sussex cricketers